Socalchemmis miramar is a species of false wolf spiders & wandering spiders in the family Zoropsidae. It is found in the United States.

References

Zoropsidae
Articles created by Qbugbot
Spiders described in 2001